Hey, Man, Smell My Finger is the sixth studio album by American funk musician George Clinton, released October 12, 1993, on Paisley Park Records. It is Clinton's second and last release for the Paisley Park label, owned by Prince. The album features an array of musical guests including Prince, Dallas Austin, Humpty Hump from Digital Underground, Ice Cube, N'Dea Davenport, Dr. Dre, and Herbie Hancock, as well P-Funk alumni including Bootsy Collins, Bernie Worrell, Maceo Parker, and Fred Wesley. Hey, Man, Smell My Finger furthers Clinton's incorporation of hip hop elements such as electronically produced beats, rapping by Clinton, and sampling of older P-Funk material.

The album was acclaimed by most music critics and was followed by a supporting tour. The New Yorker called it "a funny, psychedelic, intricate collection of grooves and insights." It went out of print soon after Paisley Park Records folded in late 1993.

Track listing
 "Martial Law" - (7:13) (George Clinton William Bryant III, Kerry Gordy)
 "Paint The White House Black" (ft. Ice Cube, Dr. Dre, Chuck D, Public Enemy, Yo-Yo, MC Breed, Kam & Shock-G) - (7:49) (Clinton, Barrett Strong, Norman Whitfield, Gordy, Bryant III)
 "Way Up" - (5:07) (Clinton, Foley)
 "Dis Beat Disrupts" - (3:29) (Clinton, William Payne, Lewis)
 "Get Satisfied" - (3:55) (Lewis)
 "Hollywood" - (5:21) (Lewis, Dallas Austin)
 "Rhythm & Rhyme" - (5:40) (Clinton, Galma, P. Hope)
 "The Big Pump" - (3:34) (Clinton, Prince)
 "If True Love" - (3:57) (Clinton, Lewis)
 "High In My Hello" - (5:16) (Clinton, Steve Washington)
 "Maximumisness" - (5:02) (Clinton, Bill Laswell, William "Bootsy" Collins)
 "Kickback" - (3:41) (Clinton, Lewis, Steven Boyd, Phelps "Catfish" Collins)
 "The Flag Was Still There" - (5:58)
 "Martial Law" - single version - (4:13)

Singles
 "Paint The White House Black"-Paisley Park 9 41057-2 (CD Maxi-single); Paisley Park 9 41057-0 (12" vinyl single); also features the track "Booty", which is not featured on the album.
 "Martial Law"-Paisley Park 9 41214-0 and a two disc colored vinyl (red and green) edition with X-rated deep down & dirty and clean mixes-Paisley Park PRO-A-5998

Videos

Martial Law-https://www.youtube.com/watch?v=qZ3en5-HzyE
Paint The White House-https://www.youtube.com/watch?v=Dxl4lQ8tmdM

Personnel

References

External links
 Hey, Man, Smell My Finger at Discogs
 Hey, Man, Smell My Finger at The Motherpage

1993 albums
George Clinton (funk musician) albums
Paisley Park Records albums